Miss Universe 2015 was the 64th Miss Universe pageant, held at The AXIS at Planet Hollywood in Las Vegas, Nevada, United States on December 20, 2015. This was the first edition of the pageant to be held under the ownership of WME/IMG, which purchased the Miss Universe Organization from Donald Trump on September 14, 2015. Consequently, it is also the first Miss Universe event to be aired by Fox and Azteca as the pageant's respective English and Spanish broadcasters instead of NBC.

At the end of the event, Paulina Vega of Colombia crowned Pia Wurtzbach of the Philippines as Miss Universe 2015. It is the Philippines' first victory in 42 years, and the third victory of the country in the pageant's history.

Contestants from 80 countries and territories competed in this year's pageant. The competition featured Steve Harvey as host and Roselyn Sánchez as backstage host. Charlie Puth, The Band Perry, and Seal performed in this year's pageant.

Background

Location and date 
Following the statements about Mexican immigrants made by Donald Trump during a speech on June 16, 2015, Colombia withdrew its bid to host the competition after the country's condemnation of Trump. Aside from that, NBCUniversal and UniMás (Spanish broadcaster of the pageant) refused to broadcast the Miss USA 2015 pageant and terminated their rights to the pageant. This prompted Trump to file lawsuits after both NBC and UniMás refused to air the pageant.

On September 11, 2015, Donald Trump purchased the stake of NBCUniversal in Miss Universe, making him the sole owner of the Miss Universe Organization. After three days, on September 14, 2015, WME/IMG acquired the Miss Universe Organization which was previously owned by Trump.

On October 28, 2015, more than a month after WME/IMG purchased the organization from Trump, Fox announced that it secured the rights to air the Miss Universe 2015 pageant, which will be held on December 20, 2015, and the Miss USA 2016 pageant which will air in 2016. The pageant will take place in The AXIS theatre of Planet Hollywood in Las Vegas, Nevada, United States. In December, Azteca América acquired the Spanish-language rights to air the pageant.

Selection of participants 
Contestants from 80 countries and territories were selected to compete in the competition. Twelve of these delegates were appointees to their national titles and three were selected to replace the original dethroned winner.

Amina Dagi, Miss Austria 2012, was appointed to represent Austria after Annika Grill, Miss Austria 2015, will only compete at Miss World 2015 due to the conflicting schedules of the two pageants. Camille Cerf, Miss France 2015, was initially supposed to compete in Miss Universe 2015, while Flora Coquerel, Miss France 2014, was supposed to compete in Miss Universe 2014. A switch happened between the two delegates due to a conflict of schedule between Miss Universe and Miss France 2016, at which Cerf was contractually obligated to be present. Ornella Obone, third runner-up of Miss Gabon 2015, was appointed to represent Gabon after Reine Ngotala, Miss Gabon 2015, will only compete at Miss World 2015 due to the conflicting schedules of the two pageants. Cynthia Samuel of Lebanon, Vladislava Evtushenko of Russia, and Refilwe Mthimunye of South Africa are also appointees to their titles after their original titleholders, Miss Lebanon 2015 Valerie Abou Chacra, Miss Russia 2015 Sofia Nikitchuk, and Miss South Africa 2015 Liesl Laurie are unable to compete because of commitments to Miss World 2015.

Barbara Ljiljak originally was supposed to represent Croatia at Miss Universe. However, Ljiljak broke her arm hours before leaving for the competition, barring her from participating at Miss Universe. Due to the incident, Mirta Kuštan, the second runner-up of Miss Universe Croatia 2015, took the responsibility as the representative of Croatia in Miss Universe 2015. Kushboo Ramnawaj, Miss Mauritius 2014, originally was supposed to represent Mauritius at Miss Universe. However, due to her inability to perform her obligations as Miss Mauritius, Ramnawaj was replaced by Sheetal Khadun, first runner-up of Miss Mauritius 2014. Myriam Arévalos, Miss Earth Paraguay 2015, assumed the Miss Universe Paraguay 2015 title after Laura Garcete, Miss Universe Paraguay 2015, became pregnant during her reign and thus was dethroned.

The 2015 edition saw the returns of Cayman Islands, Denmark, Montenegro, and Vietnam. Cayman Islands and Montenegro last competed in 2012, while Denmark and Vietnam last competed in 2013. Egypt, Ethiopia, Guam, Kazakhstan, Kenya, Lithuania, Saint Lucia, Slovenia, Sri Lanka, Trinidad and Tobago, and Turks and Caicos Islands withdrew. Aigerim Smagulova was appointed as the representative of Kazakhstan at Miss Universe after Regina Valter, Miss Universe Kazakhstan 2015, decided to compete in Miss Universe 2016. However, Smagulova withdrew due to personal reasons. Miss Universe Slovenia Ana Haložan suffered an accident when she arrived in Las Vegas, which resulted in hospitalization, preventing her from participating in registration activities, interviews and pictorials. She was not present at the first official events but stayed in Las Vegas until the pageant was over. She suffered a seizure and had her face partially paralyzed. Despite her withdrawal, she was given an opportunity to walk on the stage during the live telecast. Egypt, Ethiopia, Guam, Kenya, Lithuania, Saint Lucia, Sri Lanka, Trinidad and Tobago, and Turks and Caicos withdrew after their respective organizations failed to hold a national competition or appoint a delegate.

Initially, Costa Rica, Mexico, and Panama will not participate in this edition due to the statements about Mexican immigrants made by Donald Trump. However, after the acquisition of the Miss Universe Organization by WME/IMG, the three countries decided to return to Miss Universe and compete.

Incidents during the pageant 
The broadcast received worldwide media attention due to an error made regarding the winner. Host Steve Harvey initially announced Ariadna Gutiérrez of Colombia as the new Miss Universe. Minutes after her coronation, Harvey returned to the stage and apologized, stating that Gutiérrez was the 1st runner-up while Pia Wurtzbach of the Philippines was the winner. He later stated that he had been confused when reading the winner's name because both names were on the card and he only noticed the "1st" by Colombia's name. Due to this, Paulina Vega had to remove the crown and sash from Gutiérrez and crown Wurtzbach as her actual successor. After the coronation, Gutiérrez burst into tears due to the incident while being surrounded by her co-candidates. Wurtzbach tried to join in and talk to Gutiérrez, but was told by some of her co-candidates to "step back", while the others snubbed her entirely.

Results

Placements

Special awards

Best National Costume

Pageant

Format 
Same with 2014, fifteen semifinalists were chosen through the preliminary competition— composed of the swimsuit and evening gown competitions and closed-door interviews. The Top 15 participated in the swimsuit competition, with 10 advancing in the competition for the evening gown competition. Five contestants will advance into the Top 5, and will participate in the question and answer portion. However, for the first time since 2000, from five, three will advance into the Final 3 and will participate in the final question and the final walk. For the first time in this edition, a real-time voting system was implemented in the pageant. Viewers can score the contestants during the swimsuit, evening gown, question and answer, and final question rounds as they happen live. The global vote and all other eliminated contestants that are not part of the Final 3 will help determine who will be the next Miss Universe.

Selection committee

Preliminary competition 
 Erika Albies – Vice President of Global Fashion Communications at IMG
 Erin Brady – Miss USA 2013 from Connecticut
 Julio Caro – Independent film and television producer and talent manager
 Keiko Uraguchi – Director of Digital Partnerships for WME/IMG
 Nischelle Turner– Correspondent for Emmy Award-winning Entertainment Tonight
 Rocky Motwani – Entrepreneur who recently co-founded his first fintech company, Jiko Services
 Zak Soreff – Entertainment marketing expert

Final telecast 
 Emmitt Smith – Former college and professional football player
 Niecy Nash – Emmy Award-nominated actress
 Olivia Culpo – Miss Universe 2012 from United States
 Perez Hilton – Blogger, columnist and television personality

Contestants
80 contestants competed for the title.

Notes

References

Universe
2015
Beauty pageants in the United States
2015 in Nevada
December 2015 events in the United States
Zappos Theater